The so-called Tigris tunnel is a cave approximately 50 miles north of Diyarbakır in Turkey. The Berkilin Cay flows through this cave. It forms a source of the Tigris, but not the main one, although the exit was long believed to be this. In fact the spring is near Bingöl not far away from the Tigris tunnel. In its vicinity there are several archaeological monuments, three Assyrian Empire and Neo-Assyrian rock reliefs and five inscriptions.

Best preserved are the rock reliefs of Tiglath-Pileser I and Shalmaneser III that are carved into the wall of the Tigris tunnel. Their production in 852 BC is shown in the relief of the bronze door bands of the Balawat Gates, now in the British Museum. Above the Tunnel there is a natural rock arch that is connected to the tunnel by a stairway created by the Urartians. Above the exit of the Tunnel there are further caves. The biggest of them bears a badly preserved relief and inscription of Shalmaneser III.

References

Sources 
Kreppner, Florian Janoscha, "Public Space in Nature: The Case of Neo-Assyrian Rock-Reliefs", Altorientalische Forschungen, 29/2 (2002): 367-383, online at Academia.edu
 Andreas Schachner (2009): Assyriens Könige an einer der Quellen des Tigris. Archäologische Forschungen im Höhlensystem des sogenannten Tigris-Tunnels. Tübingen.

External links 

 Website of the University of Munich about the Tigristunnel

Archaeological sites in Southeastern Anatolia
Geography of Diyarbakır Province
Tigris River
Landforms of Diyarbakır Province
Caves of Turkey
Rock reliefs in Turkey
Assyrian art and architecture